The La Dolce Vita was built in 1897 in Groningen, Netherlands.  She originally served as a cargo barge in the Netherlands. She presently serves as a hotel barge, owned by Giampaolo Friso.

History
The original barge was powered by sail. She was first motorized in the 1950s and in the 1960s was lengthened by 10m (with square chines).

In 1975, she was purchased by Peter Mastenbroeks. She was shortened back to her original length of 23m (x5m) and her name was changed to Lobbes.  In 1979, she was transformed into a sailing barge.

She was sold in 1983 and continued to be operated as a sailing barge by a French couple. Around 1988, she was sold to a new owner in Venice and converted to a hotel barge in 1990. She continues her life as a hotel barge there today.

She has worked in the Netherlands, throughout Scandinavia, France, and Italy. She has also sailed under the names of "Hoop en Vertrouwen", "Gerris", and "Lobbes".

La Dolce Vita currently has 3 passenger cabins, allowing her to carry up to 6 passengers. She also has separate crew quarters which house the crew of three. The crew consists of the captain, tour guide/deck-hand, and chef.  The crew is generally Italian with one crew-member who speaks English.

References

External links
European Waterways Website

Hotel barges
Barges
1897 ships